Qanat-e Farrokh (also Romanized as Qanāt-e Farrokh) is a village in Sarduiyeh Rural District, Sarduiyeh District, Jiroft County, Kerman Province, Iran. At the 2006 census, its population was 106, in 27 families.

References 

Populated places in Jiroft County